Government Senior Secondary School, Nilokheri  is a public school teaching students in 6th through twelfth grade from Nilokheri township of Karnal in Haryana, India.

References

Nilokheri
High schools and secondary schools in Haryana